"I Believe in You" is a 1961 song written by Frank Loesser for his musical How to Succeed in Business Without Really Trying, where it was introduced by Robert Morse. The protagonist of the musical, J. Pierrepont Finch, sings the song to himself in the mirror while shaving. In the movie version, Rosemary (played by Michele Lee) also sings it to Pierrepont (again played by Morse).

Notable recordings
 Anita O'Day – included in her album Time for 2 (1962)
 Peggy Lee – Sugar 'n' Spice (1962)
 Jack Jones – for his album She Loves Me (1963).
 Sarah Vaughan – The Explosive Side of Sarah Vaughan (1963)
 Nancy Wilson – Broadway – My Way (1964)
 Frank Sinatra and Count Basie – It Might As Well Be Swing (1964)
 Shirley Bassey – Shirley Stops the Shows (1965)
 Ron Collier Tentet - Ron Collier Tentet (1965)
Bobby Darin – In a Broadway Bag (Mame) (1966)
 Dionne Warwick – On Stage and in the Movies (1967)
 Steve Lawrence and Eydie Gorme – Together on Broadway (1967).
 Jo Stafford and Warren Covington – recorded in 1969 for a Reader's Digest set.

References

1961 songs
Songs from musicals
Songs written by Frank Loesser